The Aero Boero AB-95 is a small Argentine civil utility aircraft that first flew on March 12, 1959.  It was built by Aero Boero S.A. of Córdoba. The AB-95 is a conventional high-wing monoplane built of fabric-covered metal structure. It has fixed undercarriage.

Variants

AB-95 – basic production version. 95 h.p. Continental C-90-12F
AB-95A de Lujo – 75 kW (100 hp) Continental O-200-A engine. 
AB-95A Fumigador – crop duster with O-200A engine, and a 55-Imp gallon (250 liters) chemical tank.
AB-95B – 1963 version with 112 kW (150 hp) engine.
AB-115BS – air ambulance version fitted with a stretcher (25 built).
AB-95-115 – 86 kW (115 hp) Textron Lycoming O-235 engine, more streamlined engine and main wheel fairings (45 built). Subsequently, this was developed into AB-115.

Specifications (AB-95)

See also

References

Notes

Bibliography
 Frawley, Gerard. The International Directory of Civil Aircraft. Aerospace Publications Pty Ltd, 1997 
Taylor, John W. R. Jane's All The World's Aircraft 1965–66. London: Samson Low, Marston, 1965.
Mondey, David  Encyclopedia of The World's Commercial and Private Aircraft, p. 9. New York: Crescent Books, 1981.

1950s Argentine civil utility aircraft
AB095
Single-engined tractor aircraft
High-wing aircraft
Aircraft first flown in 1959